Tanya Davis is a Canadian singer-songwriter and poet, based in Halifax, Nova Scotia. Her style is marked primarily by spoken word poetry set to music.

Background

Born in Summerside, Prince Edward Island, she moved to Ottawa for a time after high school to attend university, and then hitchhiked to British Columbia, where she worked in community development before moving to Halifax in 2005.

Career
Shortly after moving to Halifax, Davis began performing spoken word poetry at various cafés in the city. She soon recorded an album, Make a List, which was nominated for Female Recording of the Year, Alternative Recording of the Year and Album of the Year at the Nova Scotia Music Awards, along with a nomination for Davis herself as New Artist of the Year, as well as four nominations for the MusicPEI Awards. She was named poet of the year in The Coast'''s annual year-end reader's poll for 2007.

She followed up with Gorgeous Morning in 2008.

She has toured across Canada and internationally as a poet and musician, both as a solo artist and with Jenn Grant.

Davis attracted international press attention in 2010 when a performance video of her poem "How to Be Alone", directed by Andrea Dorfman, became popular on YouTube. She subsequently released her third album, Clocks and Hearts Keep Going, in November 2010. The album was produced by Jim Bryson.

Davis authored a book of poetry titled At First, Lonely in spring 2011, published by Canadian publisher The Acorn Press. She also served as poet laureate of the Halifax Regional Municipality from 2011 to 2013.

In 2013, she wrote the poetic narration to Millefiore Clarkes' Island Green, a short documentary produced by the National Film Board of Canada about organic farming in PEI.

In 2014, she appeared in her first acting role, starring in Andrea Dorfman's film Heartbeat.

In 2020 Dorfman and Davis again collaborated on the short film How to Be At Home, based on another poem by Davis about coping with isolation during the COVID-19 pandemic in Canada. The film was named to the Toronto International Film Festival's year-end Canada's Top Ten list for 2020.

Personal life

Davis has stated in the press that she identifies as queer:

Discography
 Make a List (2006)
 Gorgeous Morning (2008)
 Clocks and Hearts Keep Going'' (2010)

References

External links
 Tanya Davis

21st-century Canadian poets
21st-century Canadian women singers
21st-century Canadian actresses
Actresses from Halifax, Nova Scotia
Actresses from Prince Edward Island
Bisexual actresses
Bisexual singers
Bisexual songwriters
Bisexual poets
Canadian folk singer-songwriters
Canadian film actresses
Canadian women poets
Canadian spoken word poets
Canadian feminists
Feminist musicians
Canadian LGBT singers
Canadian LGBT songwriters
Canadian LGBT poets
Living people
Musicians from Prince Edward Island
Musicians from Halifax, Nova Scotia
People from Summerside, Prince Edward Island
Queer women
Queer actresses
Queer singers
Queer songwriters
Queer poets
Writers from Prince Edward Island
21st-century Canadian women writers
Canadian women pop singers
Year of birth missing (living people)
Poets Laureate of Halifax, Nova Scotia
21st-century Canadian LGBT people
Canadian bisexual writers